Yi'an County is a county in the west of Heilongjiang province, China. It is under the jurisdiction of the prefecture-level city of Qiqihar.

Administrative divisions 
Yi'an County is divided into 6 towns and 9 townships. 
6 towns
 Yi'an, Yilong, Shuangyang, Sanxing, Zhongxin, Xinxing
9 townships
 Furao, Jiefang, Yangchun, Xinfa, Taidong, Shangyou, Hongxing, Xianfeng, Xintun

Demographics

Climate

Notes and references

External links

  Government site - 

Districts of Qiqihar